Luís Carlos Nunes da Silva, nicknamed Carlinhos (19 November 1937 – 22 June 2015), played for Flamengo between 1958 and 1969. Because of his elegant football and his thin voice, he was known as "The Violin". In Flamengo, he won the 1961 Torneio Rio-São Paulo and twice the Rio State Championship (1963 and 1965).

Carlinhos was capped for the Brazil national team several times in the 1960s.

He was one of the few players to receive the Belfort Duarte Trophy ("fair play award") from the Brazilian Football Confederation (CBF). The award is given to the players who have never received a red card.

His career as a manager started in 1983, when he coached Flamengo for five matches. Four years later, he was back at Flamengo when former coach Antônio Lopes was fired for the bad results in the 1987 Rio State Championship finals. At that time, Flamengo's squad had Brazilian star Renato Gaúcho, veteran players (such as Zico, Leandro, Andrade, Nunes and Edinho), and young ones, that had just came from the youth squad. Zico, the main star of the club, still recovering from several knee surgeries, wasn't at his top form. Carlinhos, with a little luck and much knowledge of the ways of the football, mixed veterans and newcomers to create a very competitive team, that won the 1987 Copa União. Five World Champions in the 1994 World Cup played for that team: Bebeto, Zinho, Aldair, Jorginho and Leonardo.

Carlinhos returned in 1991, in similar conditions. His squad had Júnior, near retirement, Zinho and many newbies (among them Djalminha and Marcelinho). After winning 1991 Rio State Championship, he won the fifth Brazilian National Championship for Flamengo in the 1992 finals against Botafogo (3-0, 2-2).

He won another important title for Flamengo in 1999, the Mercosur Cup.

As professional he disputed 880 matches: 517 as player and 313 as coach.

On 12 February 2011, he was honored for Flamengo, with the unveiling of a bust and a square at the headquarters of the Club. Carlinhos died on 22 June 2015.

Honours

Player

Flamengo 
 Torneio Rio–São Paulo: 1961
 Campeonato Carioca: 1963, 1965

Manager

Flamengo 

 Copa Mercosur: 1999
 Campeonato Brasileiro Série A: 1992
 Copa União: 1987
 Campeonato Carioca: 1991, 1999, 2000

References

External links

JB Online

1937 births
2015 deaths
Brazil international footballers
CR Flamengo footballers
CR Flamengo managers
Guarani FC managers
Brazilian football managers
Campeonato Brasileiro Série A managers
Association football midfielders
Footballers from Rio de Janeiro (city)
Brazilian footballers